Opharus rudis is a moth of the family Erebidae. It was described by William Schaus in 1911. It is found in Costa Rica.

References

Opharus
Moths described in 1911
Moths of Central America